Alioranus is a genus of  dwarf spiders that was first described by Eugène Louis Simon in 1926.

Species
 it contains six species:
Alioranus chiardolae (Caporiacco, 1935) – Turkmenistan to China, Karakorum
Alioranus diclivitalis Tanasevitch, 1990 – Caucasus (Russia, Azerbaijan)
Alioranus distinctus Caporiacco, 1935 – Karakorum
Alioranus minutissimus Caporiacco, 1935 – Karakorum
Alioranus pastoralis (O. Pickard-Cambridge, 1872) – Greece, Turkey, Israel, Jordan, Tajikistan
Alioranus pauper (Simon, 1881) (type) – Mediterranean

See also
 List of Linyphiidae species

References

Araneomorphae genera
Linyphiidae
Spiders of Asia